St. Plegmund's well lies about  to the west of St Peter's Church, Plemstall near the village of Mickle Trafford, Cheshire, England.  It is named after Plegmund, who later became Archbishop of Canterbury, and who is believed to have lived as a hermit nearby. The well is situated on the edge of a low cliff to the east of which is one of the channels of the River Gowy.  It is one of two holy wells in west Cheshire.  An inscribed sandstone curb was added in 1907 which was dedicated by the Venerable E. Barber, Archdeacon of Chester, on 11 November 1907.  The earliest documentary evidence of the well is in a quitclaim dated 1301.

A survey of the well was carried out in 1995 which found that it is a square stone-lined pit with two large slabs on either side and two steps down from the southern side beside the road.  In the bottom of the well is a ceramic pipe which has been inserted at a later date.  At the time of the survey there was water present up to the level of the first step.  The cover slabs show some signs of damage but there was no sign of the curbs added in 1907.

It is said to have been used for baptisms up to the 20th century.  In the 1990s, it was noticed that the hawthorn tree overhanging the well was dressed periodically and during the later 1990s, archaeologists from Chester City Council led local children on a well dressing walk on St Plegmund's feast day (2 August). This continued until 2000, when a more formal annual well dressing event was revived.  The well is a scheduled monument.

See also

Scheduled Monuments in Cheshire (pre-1066)

References

Holy wells in England
Religious places
Springs of England
Scheduled monuments in Cheshire